For the 2010–11 Mid Wales Football League, the league was split into two divisions. 15 teams formed Division 1 and 13 teams formed Division 2. Division One began with its first match on 13 August 2010, with the first Division Two match the following day. Both divisions finished on 14 May 2011.

On 9 July 2010, it was announced that Defaid Du had been successful in their application to join the newly formed Division 2, but they withdrew from the league on 10 August, along with Hay St Marys.

Division 1

League table

Results

Division 2

League table

Results

References

External links
 SPAR Mid-Wales Football League

Mid Wales Football League seasons
3